Ezra Jenkinson (1872–1947) was an English composer and violinist. His best known work, the Elves' Dance, makes extensive use of spiccato and is a show piece for intermediate beginners of the violin.

Life 
Jenkinson was born in Todmorden. According to the English author and artist William Holt, Jenkinson was given a grant by a local patron to study music in Leipzig, Germany, in his youth. After seven years, he returned to his home town to live alone and avoided the public after selling the rights to his compositions he was amassing. He died in his home town of Todmorden.

Selected compositions 
Chamber music

 Sechs lyrische Stücke (1.–3. Lage) (6 Lyric Pieces in First to Third Position) for violin and piano (1894)
 An der Wiege (Lullaby; Berceuse)
 Elfentanz (Elves' Dance; Danse des Sylphes)
 Melodie
 Mazurka
 Barcarolle
 Scherzo
 Kleine Suite (Little Suite; Petite Suite) for violin and piano (1900)
 La Fontaine
 Air
 Berceuse
 Gavotte et Musette
 Humoreske
 Serenade

Piano
 Frühlingslied (Spring Song) (1892)

References 

1872 births
1947 deaths
19th-century classical composers
19th-century classical violinists
19th-century British male musicians
20th-century classical composers
20th-century classical violinists
20th-century British male musicians
Composers for violin
English classical composers
English classical violinists
English male classical composers
English Romantic composers
Male classical violinists